Wendeen H. Eolis (born October 13, 1944) is an American entrepreneur, government advisor, and public servant, noted in The American Lawyer Legal Recruiter Directory as the "founder of EOLIS, the first search firm exclusively for attorneys, the "inventor of the legal search industry" and "founder of the National Association of Legal Search Consultants," (digital and print editions, January 2022).

An experienced government official, envoy, and special advisor, that vets lawyers for government appointments and assists in selection of special counsel in the aftermath of catastrophic events.

She is also an internationally recognized poker tournament player, profiled on the A&E Television Network, Biography Close Up program, among others. Her business and legal affairs articles and lectures/seminars emphasize negotiation and decision strategies. She often uses experiences at poker tables to illustrate her points.

Eolis is the CEO of Wendeen Eolis Enterprises, Inc. (also known as EOLIS International Group),  her attorney search and legal/government affairs consultancy specializing in searches/vetting of lawyers as partners, general counsels, and corporate board directors, and advising on attorney career transitions. Eolis advises corporate boards, C-Suites and individual attorney candidates in connection with corporate board seats, and provides various legal consulting services, including law firm media relations counsel, and expert witness testimony in federal and state court/arbitration proceedings.

At Wendeen Eolis Enterprises (which hosts the Eolis Institute for Leadership), Eolis also coordinates seminars and other speaking engagements on negotiation and decision strategies.

Eolis’ public service includes assignments in New York City, New York State, federal and international venues. As Chief Operating Officer and Commander of Hope's Champion Task Force, she sets policies and procedures and oversees vetting teams that evaluate lawyers for sensitive government appointments and special counsel assignments following terrorism incidents and other cataclysmic events. Eolis previously served as a special advisor to Mayor Rudolph W. Giuliani and as first assistant and senior advisor to Governor George E. Pataki (NY).

Career Path 
In 1967, while still a student at NYU, Eolis established a solo legal recruiting/attorney vetting business. In 1969, two years after she received her BA degree, she founded the first search firm specializing exclusively in searches for practicing lawyers.

At 30, she was elected president of the Association of Personnel Services of New York State (APCNY), and 10 years later she founded and served as chairman of the board of the National Association of Legal Search Consultants (NALSC).

In her forties, Eolis became a pioneer for women in major poker competition. In 2008, Eolis was elected Chairman of the World Poker Association, serving until midsummer, when she accepted a role as a legal consultant in the upcoming U.S. presidential elections. Eolis has served as a member of the Players Advisory Council of the World Series of Poker (WSOP) and was the Chair of the WSOP International Players Advisory Council. She is referenced by the WSOP as the “Grand Dame of Poker.“ Also, she was elected to the Seniors (Poker) Hall of Fame in 2016.

Eolis is a lecturer and public speaker   and an instructor on UStream for New York's Learning Annex, where she teaches people reading principles for use in business, politics, and poker. And, she also has been a member of the board of directors of various not for profit organizations, notably including WNYC  and New Yorkers for Children. She is also a journalist with substantial writing credits for professional trade journals and poker media.

Law and business

Born in New York City, Eolis began her career as a headhunter for lawyers, with a B.A. degree in philosophy, and three small children in tow. In 1969 she founded Eolis, Inc., the first placement and consulting firm for practicing lawyers. The firm also does related research on the legal profession and the legal marketplace.

Eolis heads a network of affiliates that perform partner searches, law firm mergers and various legal consulting assignments related to law practice management, legal affairs crisis management, law department evaluations, and legal fee reviews. She also counsels and coaches politicians and clients of legal services.

In 1974 Eolis was the first woman and youngest president of APCNY. In 1975 she was the youngest member on the Board of Directors of the NAPC and in the same year the youngest recipient of  "APCNY's  Industry Service Award, for "lifetime achievement." In 1984, she founded and served as the first president of the National Association of Legal Search Consultants (NALSC). She has also been a recipient of the NALSC's "Distinguished Service Award."

In 2006, she founded Eolis Institute for Leadership, which produces leadership workshops and teaches Eolis' "12 Steps to People Reading Excellence". She lectures on negotiation and presentation techniques, often using her experience gained at poker tables.

Politics and government

Eolis has been involved in politics since the 70's in the development of updated legislation regarding the executive recruiting industry. While president of APCNY, Ms. Eolis was recognized with a "special citation" by the New York State Senate for her contribution to the modernization of employment agency laws in New York State.

In the late 80's Eolis was a career advisor and confidante to Rudy Giuliani, working with him on his plans, including his initial Mayoral campaign. Then, after his first election, in 1993, she served on his transition team, and later as an advisor in City Hall operations, including: communications, law department, and personnel matters. In a 2018 Washington Post article about Giuliani's appointment to President Donald Trump's personal legal team, Eolis noted that she had not been aware of a close friendship between Trump and Giuliani during the several years she worked with him.

Eolis served in the Pataki Administration (appointment 1995) as first assistant to the governor and senior advisor on "special projects" including personnel matters, rent deregulation, and gaming issues.

Since 9.11, she has overseen Hope's Champion Task Force, with an expanded mandate; working with government representatives and others on various attorney vetting projects related to government crises, emergency preparedness and disaster recovery legal affairs initiatives and on high level government appointments.

Gaming industry consulting

Eolis provides specialized consulting services to casinos, gaming properties, and tournament organizing companies with regard to event contracts, regulatory affairs, counsel selection, and tournament consulting, among her various matters. She also does special reports and writes about legal and business-gaming issues.   She analyses, lectures, and writes periodically about land-based, tribal, and online gaming matters.

In September 2010, Eolis was a finalist in the nominations for the London-based Women in Gaming Awards, and since October 2010 when Eolis was a moderator at the inaugural Monaco iGaming conference, sponsored by the principality and HRH Prince Albert of Monaco, she has been a featured speaker at international gaming conferences.

Poker

Eolis has "cashed" a total of seven times at the World Series of Poker (WSOP)  and was appointed to the World Series of Poker Players Advisory Council (PAC) in 2006. She was the first woman to cash in the main event of the WSOP (1986) and the first one to do it twice (1993). She has since cashed at the WSOP in 2003, 2004, 2006, 2007, and 2009. The WSOP issued a commemorative chip for her "milestone" for women (1996). Commissioner of the WSOP, Jeffrey Pollack, dubbed Eolis the "grand dame of poker". Eolis also won the European Open No Limit Hold'em Tournament in 1990 and has cashed in the World Poker Tour, and the United States Poker Championship. Eolis was elected to the Professional Poker Tour (2004–05).

Publications

Eolis’ published writings include articles for the New York Law Journal, Women's Business of New York, Poker Player Newspaper (2002-2015), and Bluff Magazine, among others. Eolis has written numerous articles on the Unlawful Internet Gambling Enforcement Act of 2006 (UIGEA) and subsequent congressional proposals to reverse the UIGEA legislation. She is also the author of Raising the Stakes, the Story of the Power Poker Dame and People Reading Secrets.

References

External links
 
 Eolis International Group
 
 Wendeen Eolis Videos

Living people
1944 births
American women in business
American businesspeople
Female poker players
American poker players
American gambling writers
American political writers
New York University alumni
American political consultants
21st-century American women